Events from the year 1952 in the United Kingdom. This year sees a change of monarch.

Incumbents
 Monarch - George VI (until 6 February), Elizabeth II (starting 6 February)
 Prime Minister – Winston Churchill (Conservative)
Parliament – 40th

Events

 5 January – Prime Minister Winston Churchill arrives in the United States for an official visit and talks with President Harry S. Truman.
 10 January – An Aer Lingus Douglas DC-3 aircraft on a London–Dublin flight crashes in Wales due to vertical draft in the mountains of Snowdonia, killing twenty passengers and the three crew.
 16 January – Sooty, Harry Corbett's glove puppet bear, first appears on BBC Television.
 30 January – British troops remain in Korea, where they have spent the last eighteen months, after a breakdown of talks that were aimed at ending the Korean War.
 1 February – The first TV detector van is commissioned in the UK, as the beginning of a clampdown on the estimated 150,000 British households that watch television illegally without a licence.
 6 February – King George VI dies at Sandringham House aged 56 early this morning. It is revealed that he had been suffering from lung cancer. He is succeeded by his 25-year-old daughter, Princess Elizabeth, Duchess of Edinburgh, who ascends to the throne as Queen Elizabeth II. The new Queen is on a visit to Kenya at the time of her father's death and returns to London the following day. She will be the longest-lived and longest-reigning British monarch, with a reign of 70 years.
 8 February – Queen Elizabeth II proclaimed Queen of the United Kingdom of Great Britain and Northern Ireland at St James's Palace.
 14 February–25 February – Great Britain and Northern Ireland compete at the Winter Olympics in Oslo and win one gold medal.
 15 February – The funeral of King George VI takes place at St George's Chapel, Windsor Castle. His body has been lying in state in Westminster Hall since 11 February.
 21 February – Compulsory identity cards, issued during World War II, are abolished.
 26 February – Prime Minister Winston Churchill announces that the United Kingdom has an atomic bomb.
 7 March – NME goes on sale for the first time in the United Kingdom.
 31 March – Computer scientist Alan Turing is convicted of "gross indecency" after admitting to a consensual homosexual relationship in Regina v. Turing and Murray. He consents to undergo oestrogen treatment to avoid imprisonment.
 29 April – The University of Southampton is chartered, first post-war university established.
 2 May – The De Havilland Comet becomes the world's first jet airliner, with a maiden flight from London to Johannesburg.
 3 May – Newcastle United F.C. win the FA Cup for a record fifth time. Last year's winners retain the trophy with a 1-0 win over Arsenal at Wembley Stadium. The only goal of the game is scored by Chilean-born forward George Robledo, the first foreigner to score in an FA Cup final.
 21 May – Eastcastle Street robbery: a post office van is held up in the West End of London and £287,000 (worth £8,189,519.66 in 2019) stolen, Britain's largest post-war robbery up to this date; the thieves are never caught.
 June – Reindeer reintroduced to the Cairngorms of Scotland.
 1 June –  One shilling charge is introduced for prescription drugs dispensed under the National Health Service.
 5 July – The last of the original trams runs in London; the citizens of London turn out in force to say farewell.
 19 July–3 August – Great Britain and Northern Ireland compete at the Olympics in Helsinki and win 1 gold, 2 silver and 8 bronze medals.
 19 July – Len Hutton is appointed as the England cricket team's first professional captain for 65 years.
 16 August – Lynmouth Flood: 34 people killed in a flood at Lynmouth in Devon. Many other people are injured and numerous buildings are damaged.
 6 September – Farnborough Airshow DH.110 crash: 31 people killed when a plane breaks up over the crowd at the Farnborough Airshow.
 19 September – English film star Charlie Chaplin, sailing to the United Kingdom with his family for the premiere of his film Limelight (London, 16 October), is told that he will be refused re-entry to the United States until he has been investigated by the U.S. Immigration Service. He chooses to remain in Europe.
 29 September – Manchester Guardian prints news, rather than advertisements, on its front page for the first time.
 3 October – Operation Hurricane: The UK explodes its first atomic bomb in the Monte Bello Islands, Australia.
 5 October – Tea rationing ends, after thirteen years, as announced by the Government two days earlier.
 8 October – Harrow and Wealdstone rail crash in North London claims the lives of 108 people.
 16 October – Limelight opens in London; writer/actor/director/producer Charlie Chaplin arrives in Britain by ocean liner; in transit, his re-entry permit to the United States is revoked by J. Edgar Hoover.
 19 October 
 A small militant Welsh republican group, Y Gweriniaethwyr, make an unsuccessful attempt to blow up a water pipeline leading from the Claerwen dam in mid Wales to Birmingham. The Claerwen reservoir is officially opened on 23 October.
 John Bamford, aged 15, rescues victims of a house fire, and becomes the youngest person to be awarded the George Cross.
 November – Royal College of General Practitioners established.
 14 November – The magazine New Musical Express (launched on 7 March) publishes the first UK Singles Chart.
 25 November – Agatha Christie's play The Mousetrap starts its run at the New Ambassadors Theatre in London. It will still be running in London as of 2022, having transferred next door to St Martin's Theatre in 1974.
 29 November – First GPO pillar box of the reign of Queen Elizabeth II to be erected in Scotland, on the Inch housing estate in Edinburgh, is attacked in protest at its bearing the Royal Cipher of Elizabeth II, considered historically incorrect in Scotland.
 4–9 December – Great Smog blankets London, causing transport chaos and, it is believed, around 4,000 deaths.
 10 December – Archer Martin and Richard Synge win the Nobel Prize in Chemistry "for their invention of partition chromatography".
 12 December – BBC children's television series Flower Pot Men debuts.
 25 December – The Queen makes her first Christmas speech to the Commonwealth.
 30 December – An RAF Avro Lancaster bomber crashes in Luqa, Malta, after an engine failure, killing three crew members and a civilian on the ground.
 December – Utility Furniture Scheme ends.
 Undated – Geoffrey Dummer proposes the integrated circuit.

Publications
 H. E. Bates' novel Love for Lydia.
 John Bingham's novel My Name is Michael Sibley.
 Henry Cecil's novel No Bail for the Judge.
 Agatha Christie's novels Mrs McGinty's Dead (Hercule Poirot) and They Do It with Mirrors (Miss Marple).
 Dorothy Edwards' children's stories My Naughty Little Sister.
 Richard Gordon's comic novel Doctor in the House.
 David Jones' epic poem The Anathemata: fragments of an attempted writing.
 C. S. Lewis' novel The Voyage of the Dawn Treader.
 Mary Norton's children's novel The Borrowers.
 Evelyn Waugh's novel Men at Arms, first of the Sword of Honour trilogy.

Births
 9 January – Hugh Bayley, English politician
 10 January – George Turpin, English boxer
 29 January – Tim Healy, actor 
 4 February – Steve Smith, English theorist and academic
 22 February – Bernard Silverman, English minister, statistician and academic
 25 February – Joey Dunlop, Northern Irish motorcycle racer (died 2000)
 4 March – David Richards, general, Chief of the Defence Staff
 11 March – Douglas Adams, author (died 2001)
 17 March – Barry Horne, animal rights activist (died 2001)
 22 March – Des Browne, politician
 28 March – Tony Brise, racing driver (died 1975)
 11 April – Peter Windsor, sports reporter
 16 April 
 Bob Humphrys, broadcaster (died 2008)
 Chaz Jankel, singer and multi-instrumentalist
 20 April 
 Andrew Jaspan, English-Australian journalist and academic
 Eric Pickles, British politician
 21 April – Cheryl Gillan, Welsh politician (died 2021)
 29 April – David Icke, conspiracy theorist and broadcaster
 12 May
Nicholas Underhill, lawyer and judge
 3 May – Allan Wells, Scottish athlete
 7 June – Liam Neeson, Northern Irish actor
 12 June – Oliver Knussen, Scottish composer (died 2018)
 17 June – Estelle Morris, politician
 20 June – Gordon Marshall, sociologist and academic
 22 June – Phil Nicholls, English professional footballer  
 25 June – Alan Green, Northern Irish sportscaster
 4 July – John Waite, rock singer, bass guitarist and songwriter
 6 July – Hilary Mantel, novelist (died 2022)
 11 July – John Kettley, weather forecaster
 15 July – Ann Dowling, mechanical engineer
 20 July – Adrian Biddle, cinematographer (died 2005)
 7 August – Alexei Sayle, comedian
 12 August – Charlie Whiting, motorsports director (died 2019)
 18 August – Pete Richens, screenwriter (died 2018)
 21 August – Joe Strummer, musician (The Clash) (died 2002)
 24 August – Ian Grob, racing driver
 25 August – Geoff Downes, keyboardist (Asia)
 27 September – Katie Fforde, novelist 
 30 September – Jack Wild, actor (died 2006)
 7 October – John Caudwell, businessman
 18 October – Jim Ratcliffe, chemical engineer and businessman
 16 November – Roger Bisby, journalist and TV presenter
 21 November – Terry Lloyd, journalist (killed 2003)
 24 November – Robin Aitken, journalist
 3 December – Mel Smith, comic actor and director (died 2013)
 6 December
 Charles Bronson, violent criminal
 Richard Walsh, actor 
 10 December – Clive Anderson, broadcast presenter, comedy writer and barrister
 13 December – Karl Howman, actor  
 20 December – Jenny Agutter, actress
 26 December – Jon Glover, actor

Deaths
 6 February – George VI (born 1895)
 4 March – Charles Scott Sherrington, physiologist, Nobel Prize laureate (born 1857)
 15 March – Nevil Sidgwick, chemist (born 1873)
19 April – Steve Conway, singer (born 1920)
 21 April – Sir Stafford Cripps, Chancellor of the Exchequer (born 1889)
 6 July – Marian Cripps, Baroness Parmoor, pacifist (born 1878)
 6 September – Gertrude Lawrence, actress (born 1898)
 29 September – John Cobb, racing car and motorboat driver (born 1899)
 30 September – Waldorf Astor, 2nd Viscount Astor, businessman and politician (born 1879)
 23 October – Windham Wyndham-Quin, 5th Earl of Dunraven and Mount-Earl, politician (born 1857)
 28 October – Billy Hughes, Welsh-descended Prime Minister of Australia (born 1862)
 15 December – Sir William Goscombe John, sculptor (born 1860)
 19 December – Colonel Sir Charles Arden-Close, cartographer (born 1865)

See also
 1952 in British music
 1952 in British television
 1952 in Northern Ireland
 1952 in Scotland
 1952 in Wales
 List of British films of 1952

References

 
Years of the 20th century in the United Kingdom